The rufous-breasted chat-tyrant (Ochthoeca rufipectoralis) is a species of bird in the family Tyrannidae. It is found in Bolivia, Colombia, Ecuador, Peru, and Venezuela.

Its natural habitats are subtropical or tropical moist montane forests and heavily degraded former forest.

References

rufous-breasted chat-tyrant
Birds of the Northern Andes
rufous-breasted chat-tyrant
Taxonomy articles created by Polbot